Tyreek Anthony Magee (born 27 August 1999) is a Jamaican professional footballer who plays as a midfielder for Belgian Pro League club Eupen and the Jamaica national football team.

Club career

Harbour View
Magee began his club career at Harbour View in Jamaica.

Eupen
The Reggae Boy Tyreek Magee signed a four year deal with Belgian top flight club Eupen from Harbour View in 2019 after impressing while on trial.

International career
He has featured for the Jamaica u20 and senior national team. In August 2019, Magee played for the Jamaica u23 national team in the Pan Am Games. 

He made his senior team debut as a late substitute against the United States in a friendly international in Washington, DC in June 2019.

Career statistics

Club

Notes

International

References

External links
 Tyreek Magee at caribbeanfootballdatabase.com

1999 births
Sportspeople from Kingston, Jamaica
Living people
Jamaican footballers
Jamaica under-20 international footballers
Jamaica international footballers
Association football midfielders
Harbour View F.C. players
K.A.S. Eupen players
National Premier League players
Belgian Pro League players
Jamaican expatriate footballers
Expatriate footballers in Belgium
Jamaican expatriate sportspeople in Belgium
2019 CONCACAF Gold Cup players
2021 CONCACAF Gold Cup players